Vivian De Gurr St George (11 March 1895 – June 1979) was an English shoeblack who worked at Piccadilly Circus, London, England. He became well-known though the publication of his autobiography, St. George of Piccadilly, in 1953, and his radio appearances.

Educated at a private school, he left home as a teenager, and travelled the world, returning with a wife, Consuelo (a nurse), and family, before setting up as a shoeblack.

He appeared as a castaway on the BBC Radio programme Desert Island Discs on 24 September 1954. He died in June 1979 at the age of 84 in Camden, London.

Bibliography

References 

1895 births
1979 deaths
British people of Indian descent
People from Westminster
Shoeshiners